Penelope Dale Kinsella (born 14 August 1963) is a New Zealand former  cricketer who played as a right-handed batter. She appeared in 6 Test matches and 20 One Day Internationals for New Zealand between 1988 and 1995. She played domestic cricket for Central Districts and Wellington. 

In 1992-93 she scored the highest aggregate ever made by a Wellington club cricketer in one season, 1259 runs. The Penny Kinsella Trophy is awarded to the Wellington U19 Women's Most Valuable Player. 

She is a teacher at Onslow College in Wellington. Her father is former cricket umpire David Kinsella.

References

External links

1963 births
Living people
Cricketers from Palmerston North
New Zealand women cricketers
New Zealand women Test cricketers
New Zealand women One Day International cricketers
Central Districts Hinds cricketers
Wellington Blaze cricketers